Silvia Miksch is an Austrian computer scientist working in information visualization, particularly for time-oriented and medical data. She is head of the Centre for Visual Analytics Science and Technology at TU Wien.

Education and career
Miksch has a master's degree and Ph.D. from the University of Vienna, earned in 1987 and 1990 respectively.

After postdoctoral research at the Austrian Research Institute for Artificial Intelligence and at Stanford University, she became a faculty member at TU Wien in 1996. She became University Professor at Danube University Krems in 2006, before moving back to TU Wien again in 2010 as the founding director of the Centre for Visual Analytics Science and Technology.

She chaired the Austrian Society for Artificial Intelligence (ÖGAI) from 1997 to 2006.

Books
Miksch is a coauthor of the books Visualization of Time-Oriented Data (with Wolfgang Aigner, Heidrun Schumann, and Christian Tominski, Springer, 2011) and Interactive Information Visualization to Explore and Query Electronic Health Records (Now Publishers, 2013). She is also the editor or co-editor of multiple edited volumes.

Recognition
In 2020, Miksch was listed in the IEEE Visualization Academy by the IEEE Visualization and Graphics Technical Community.

References

External links
Home page

Year of birth missing (living people)
Living people
Austrian computer scientists
Austrian women computer scientists
University of Vienna alumni
Academic staff of TU Wien